Seelenschmerz (Soulache) is the second album by Blutengel. It was re-released in 2011 remastered as a 2 disc release, the original remastered album and a bonus disc of tracks from the original bonus disc, the Bloody Pleasures single, and a compilation track.

Track listing

The female version of "Fairyland" is sung by Kati and appears on the compilation Machineries of Joy vol. 1.

Info
 All tracks written and produced by Christian "Chris" Pohl
 Male vocals by Chris Pohl
 Female vocals on track 2, "Seelenschmerz", by Gini Martin
 Female vocals on track 3, "I'm Dying Alone" by Kati, and Gini
 Female vocals on track 8, "Soul Of Ice", by Kati Roloff

Bonus CD
 Male vocals by Chris Pohl
 Female vocals on track 4, "My World", by Kati Roloff

References

External links
 Blutengel Discography Info

2001 albums
Blutengel albums